Bargaining is a type of negotiation.

Bargaining may also refer to:

 "Bargaining" (Buffy the Vampire Slayer), a 2001 television episode
 Collective bargaining, process of negotiating between employers and their employees, or employee representatives
 Plea bargain, an agreement in a criminal case
 Bargaining (psychology), one of the five stages of grief in the Kübler-Ross model

See also
 
 Dickering (wapentake), a geographic subdivision in England
 Dicker (surname)
 Haggle (disambiguation)